Alejandra Alicia Flores Carlos (born 1961) is a Chilean teacher of Aymara descent who was elected as a member of the Chilean Constitutional Convention.

References

External links
 

1961 births
Living people
21st-century Chilean politicians
Members of the Chilean Constitutional Convention
University of Tarapacá alumni
21st-century Chilean women politicians